Diego Benedito Galvão Máximo, sometimes known as just Diego (born 22 April 1986) is a Brazilian footballer who currently plays as a defender for ni-Vanuatu side Erakor Golden Star in the Port Vila Football League.

Club career
Diego Máximo had a spell with Pogoń Szczecin in the Polish Ekstraklasa during 2007.

He moved to Payam for 2008–09 season where he had good performances but, because of the relegation of the team, he moved to Esteghlal Ahvaz in the Summer of 2009 where his team was relegated again.

Club Career Statistics
Last Update  11 December 2012

References

Pogoń Szczecin players
Brazilian expatriate footballers
Expatriate footballers in Poland
Expatriate footballers in Iran
Esteghlal Ahvaz players
Payam Mashhad players
Ekstraklasa players
Association football defenders
Brazilian footballers
1986 births
Living people
Brazilian expatriate sportspeople in Poland
Expatriate footballers in Turkey
Expatriate footballers in Malta
Expatriate footballers in Vanuatu
Expatriate footballers in the Solomon Islands
Expatriate footballers in Fiji